Low chronology may refers to:
Low chronology of the ancient Near East
Low chronology of the Eighteenth dynasty of Egypt